is the debut single of Japanese singer-songwriter Miho Komatsu. It was released on May 28, 1997 under Zain Records.

Chart performance
The single reached number 9 in its first week and sold 40,230 copies. The single charted for 32 weeks and sold 325,850 copies overall. This was her highest sold single in her career up until then.

In media
"Nazo" was used in anime Case Closed (Detective Conan) as third opening theme, although the single version differs from the on-air version. "Kotoba ni Dekinai" was used as ending theme for Nagoya TV program "Yoshimoto Gozensama Party".

Track listing

Covers
The song was first covered in 2004 by Korean girl-group Jewerly in their single "Superstar" as coupling song in Korean language.

In 2008, Aiuchi Rina and U-ka Saegusa in dB cover this song in their single "100 Mono no Tobira"".

La Pompon

In 2015, the Japanese pop girl group  La PomPon covered the song as the 41st opening theme song of Detective Conan.

References 

1997 songs
1997 singles
2015 singles
Miho Komatsu songs
Being Inc. singles
Case Closed songs
Songs written by Miho Komatsu
Song recordings produced by Daiko Nagato